Newlands West is a township located 15 km (by road) north-west of Durban in the province of KwaZulu-Natal, South Africa.

References 

Populated places in eThekwini Metropolitan Municipality
Townships in KwaZulu-Natal